The Poynter Baronetcy, of Albert Gate in the City of Westminster in the County of London, was a title in the Baronetage of the United Kingdom. It was created on 24 July 1902 for artist Sir Edward Poynter, who was the President of the Royal Academy of Art from 1896 to 1918. The title became extinct on the death of his grandson, the third Baronet in 1968.

Poynter baronets, of Albert Gate (1902)

Sir Edward John Poynter, 1st Baronet (1836–1919)
Sir Ambrose Macdonald Poynter, 2nd Baronet (1867–1923)
Sir Hugh Edward Poynter, 3rd Baronet (1882–1968)

References

Extinct baronetcies in the Baronetage of the United Kingdom